UNIDROIT Convention on Stolen or Illegally Exported Cultural Objects (Rome, 1995) is the international treaty on the subject of cultural property protection. It attempts to strengthen the main weaknesses of the 1970 UNESCO Convention on the Means of Prohibiting and Preventing the Illicit Import, Export and Transfer of Ownership of Cultural Property. The UNIDROIT Convention seeks to fight the illicit trafficking of cultural property by modifying the buyer's behaviour, obliging him/her to check the legitimacy of their purchase.

Due diligence and Burden of Proof

The Convention states that if a cultural property was stolen it must be returned (Chapter II, Art. 3.1). 
Any possessor of a stolen cultural object required to return it might be compensated only if he/she can prove due diligence at the time of the purchase and that he/she neither knew nor ought reasonably to have known that the objects was stolen (Chapter II, Art. 4.1 ). 

To assess the legitimacy of the object's origin, art market players can use international and national databases dedicated to cultural property protection, for instance, the INTERPOL Stolen Works of Art Database collects information about stolen cultural property and issues identification numbers to cultural objects.

Whereas Chapter II of the Convention deals with stolen cultural objects, Chapter III contemplates the export of cultural property in violation of national export restrictions. A State Party can request the competent Court of another Contracting State to order the return of a cultural object illegally exported from its territory if the removal of the object caused detriment in one of the ways listed under Article 5.3. Again, the burden of proof is on the possessor to demonstrate that he/she "neither knew nor ought reasonably to have known at the time of acquisition that the object had been illegally exported" (Art. 6.1).

These rules apply equally to cultural objects inherited or received as gifts. Either an heir or a beneficiary has the same responsibility as a buyer. Therefore, museums and other public institutions must carry out checks over the origin of donated objects.

The 1970 UNESCO Convention and the 1995 UNIDROIT Convention

The UNESCO Convention on the Means of Prohibiting and Preventing the Illicit Import, Export and Transfer of Ownership of Cultural Property (1970 UNESCO Convention) and the UNIDROIT Convention are compatible and complementary. 
As distinct from the UNESCO Convention, the UNIDROIT Convention focuses on the recovery of cultural property. The UNIDROIT Convention establishes conditions for claims of restitution/return of stolen or illegally exported cultural objects respectively.

Although the UNIDROIT Convention follows key terminology of 1970 UNESCO Convention, cultural goods do not need to be defined as such by the State.

Furthermore, the term  "cultural property" is replaced by a more comprehensive "cultural object", but the list of their categories remains the same. The concept of "illicit export" is replaced by "illegal export",  which references a prohibitive law rather than a general forbiddance.

Time Restrictions to Claims for Repatriation

The Convention regulates the time period that an affected party may bring a claim for the restitution of stolen cultural property or the return of those illegally exported. 
Such a claim may be brought in three years from the time when the claimant or the requesting State knew the location of the cultural property and the identity of the possessor and in 50 years since the time of the theft, the export or from the date on which the object should have been returned (Art. 3.3 and art. 5.5 ). However, there are exceptions to this rule for stolen objects. 
Cultural objects that form an integral part of an identified monument or archaeological site, or which belong to a public collection are not subject to time limitation other than a period of three years (Art. 3.4). In addition, a Contracting State may declare that a claim warrants an extended time limit of 75 years or longer if so stated in its national law (Art. 3.5).

The UNIDROIT Convention is not a retroactive treaty. Its provisions only apply to cultural property stolen or illegally exported after the Convention entered into force (Art. 10). However the UNIDROIT Convention "does not in any way legitimise any illegal transaction of whatever which has taken place before the entry into force of this Convention" and does not "limit any right of a State or other person to make a claim under remedies available outside the framework" of the Convention (Art. 10.3).

See also
Art repatriation

References

External links
List of countries that have accessed/ratified the Convention
http://www.unidroit.org/instruments/cultural-property/1995-convention
UNESCO web page about illicit traffic of cultural property
INTERPOL database on the stolen works of art
Code of ethics for dealers in cultural property

International cultural heritage documents
UNIDROIT treaties
Treaties concluded in 1995
Treaties entered into force in 1998
1995 in Italy
Treaties of Afghanistan
Treaties of Algeria
Treaties of Angola
Treaties of Argentina
Treaties of Azerbaijan
Treaties of Bolivia
Treaties of Bosnia and Herzegovina
Treaties of Brazil
Treaties of Cambodia
Treaties of the People's Republic of China
Treaties of Colombia
Treaties of Croatia
Treaties of Cyprus
Treaties of Denmark
Treaties of Ecuador
Treaties of El Salvador
Treaties of Finland
Treaties of Gabon
Treaties of Greece
Treaties of Guatemala
Treaties of Honduras
Treaties of Hungary
Treaties of Iran
Treaties of Italy
Treaties of Lithuania
Treaties of Laos
Treaties of New Zealand
Treaties of Nigeria
Treaties of Norway
Treaties of Panama
Treaties of Paraguay
Treaties of Peru
Treaties of Portugal
Treaties of Romania
Treaties of Slovakia
Treaties of Slovenia
Treaties of Spain
Treaties of Sweden
Treaties of North Macedonia
Treaties of Tunisia
Art and cultural repatriation after World War II
Art and culture treaties